A major earthquake occurred in Nepal on 12 May 2015 at 12:50 pm local time (07:05 UTC) with a moment magnitude of 7.3,  southeast of Kodari. The epicenter was on the border of Dolakha and Sindhupalchowk, two districts of Nepal. This earthquake occurred on the same fault as the larger magnitude 7.8 earthquake of 25 April, but further east than the original quake. As such, it is considered to be an aftershock of the April quake. Shaking was felt in northern parts of India including Bihar, Uttar Pradesh and West Bengal. Tremors were felt as far as about 2,400 km away from the epicenter in Chennai.

Minutes later, another 6.3-magnitude earthquake hit Nepal with its epicenter in Ramechhap, east of Kathmandu. The earthquake was felt in Bangladesh, China and many other states in India. The impact of these tremors was felt even 1,000 kilometres away in the Indian capital New Delhi, where buildings shook and office workers evacuated.

Damage and casualties

The aftershock caused mass panic as many people were living in the open air after the 25 April quake. "For the first seconds, it was complete silence. By the fifth second, everybody started to scream", said an eyewitness. "It was really, really intense. Even when the shaking stopped, people were still screaming". The tremor caused fresh landslides, and destroyed some buildings which survived the first quake.

In Nepal, at least 153 people were killed by the earthquake and more than 3,200 people were injured, primarily in mountain regions of the northeast. As of 15 May, 1,700 people were still receiving treatment for their injuries. Thirty-two of the nation's seventy-five districts were affected by the quake. In Kathmandu, the streets were quickly filled as people fled buildings. Within hours of the quake, tents began to fill open areas of the city as residents were afraid to go back inside. The district of Sindhupalchowk, which was also hit hard in the original quake, was among the worst-affected areas. Between the two quakes, 95% of the areas houses were destroyed. Areas around Mount Everest also saw fresh damage.

In India, Delhi Metro service was briefly interrupted as people fled their homes and places of employment. At least 17 people were killed by the quake in India. Sixteen of the deaths occurred in Bihar and one in Uttar Pradesh. One woman in the Tibet region of China was killed when falling rocks hit her car.

A US military helicopter, UH-1 Huey, carrying six US Marines and two Nepalese soldiers, went missing when on a disaster relief operation in central Nepal. On 14 May the wreckage was found in burned condition in the Gorthali area. Three bodies were recovered from the crash site. On 16 May, when a total of eight bodies were recovered, the Pentagon spokesman Steve Warren said that although the cause of the crash was not yet known, a nearby Indian helicopter had heard radio chatter about a possible fuel problem.

Rescue and relief
The Nepal Army continued its Operation Sankat Mochan to aid the affected population along with the Indian Army and delivered several tons of relief materials, and rescued stranded people.

According to geophysicist Amy Vaughan, the 12 May quake is likely a sign that more aftershocks are on the way. "Generally, in the days and weeks and months [seismic activity] tapers off", she said. "But ... this is going to temporarily increase [the aftershocks]".

See also

 Geology of Nepal
 Geology of the Himalaya
 Humanitarian response to the 2015 Nepal earthquake
 Indian Plate
 List of avalanches by death toll
 List of earthquakes in Nepal
 Operation Maitri – the Indian Armed Forces earthquake relief operation
 Operation Sahayogi Haat
 Operation Sankat Mochan – the Nepal Army earthquake relief operation
 Thrust tectonics
 List of earthquakes in 2015

References

External links

 Deadly earthquake Nepal on Earthquake Report Website

 
Nepal earthquake, May
2015 in Bangladesh
2015 disasters in China
2015 disasters in India
2015 in Nepal
2015 in Tibet
Earthquakes in Bangladesh
Earthquakes in Tibet
Earthquakes in India
2015, May
May 2015 events in Asia
Buried rupture earthquakes